Condell may refer to:

Almirante Condell, the name of several Chilean Navy ships
Condell Park, suburb In Sydney, Australia
Henry Condell, actor in Shakespeare's company
Henry Condell (mayor), first mayor of Melbourne
Pat Condell, English comedian promoting the cause of atheism

See also
Saint-Laurent-de-Condel, village in Normandy